The Tangyud Monastery (also written bTang-rGyud, Tangyuth) or Sa-skya-gong-mig Gompa at the village of Komic, two km southeast of Hikkim in the Spiti Valley of Himachal Pradesh, India, is built like a fortified castle on the edge of a deep canyon, with massive slanted mud walls and battlements with vertical red ochre and white vertical stripes which make them look much taller than they really are. It is located on the periphery of the Kibber Wildlife Sanctuary.

History
It is one of only two monasteries belonging to the Sakya sect left in Spiti - the other, at Kaza itself, is small and relatively insignificant. It reportedly had 60 monks in 1855.

Although it is considered by locals to be very ancient, an examination of the present fortified structure modelled on a Tibetan castle, and other circumstantial evidence, makes it likely that it was built early in the 14th century when the Sakyapas rose to power under Mongol patronage.

It is thought, however, that there was an earlier Kadampa establishment here founded by Rinchen Zangpo (958-1055 CE) and named Rador-lha. The name, Tangyud, may refer to the Sakya revision of the Tang-rGyud, or the 87 volumes of Tantra treatises which form part of the Tengyur. This was carried out about 1310 CE by a team of scholars under the Sakya lama, Ch'os-Kyi-O'd-zer.

The monastery is patronised by the local chieftains of Spiti and the monastery has a special cell built into southeastern side for them when they visit. Tangyud village is at the foot of the monastery (altitude 4,470 m or 14,665 ft). The monastery itself was apparently badly damaged in the earthquake of 1972.  And this monastery was several times robbed around 1920-1940 by the thief and robbers from Kashmirs and other parts of the areas. They took all the golds and broke all the statues and monks had to run away from the monastic to save their lives.

Gallery

Footnotes

References
 Francke, A. H. (1914, 1926). Antiquities of Indian Tibet. Two Volumes. Calcutta. 1972 reprint: S. Chand, New Delhi.
 Handa, O. C. (1987). Buddhist Monasteries in Himachal Pradesh. Indus Publishing Company, New Delhi. .
 Kapadia, Harish. (1999). Spiti: Adventures in the Trans-Himalaya. Second Edition. (1st edition 1996). Indus Publishing Company, New Delhi. .

External links
 Lahaul & Spiti Tourism

Buddhism in Lahaul and Spiti district
Buildings and structures in Lahaul and Spiti district
Buddhist monasteries in Himachal Pradesh
Religious organizations established in the 11th century